Report on Death is a 1993 Peruvian drama film directed by Danny Gavidia. The film was selected as the Peruvian entry for the Best Foreign Language Film at the 66th Academy Awards, but was not accepted as a nominee.

Cast
 Diego Bertie
 Marisol Palacios
 Carlos Cano de la Fuente
 Carlos Gassols
 Martha Figueroa
 Aristóteles Picho

See also
 List of submissions to the 66th Academy Awards for Best Foreign Language Film
 List of Peruvian submissions for the Academy Award for Best Foreign Language Film

References

External links
 

1993 films
1993 drama films
Peruvian drama films
1990s Peruvian films
1990s Spanish-language films